Gödəkli (known as Aleksandrovka until 1992) is a village and municipality in the Khachmaz Rayon of Azerbaijan.  It has a population of 1,053. It was founded in the early twentieth century by immigrants from central Russia.

References 

Populated places in Khachmaz District